James Thomas McCalman (February 15, 1914 – June 18, 1977) was an American politician. He served as a Democratic member of the Louisiana State Senate.

McCalman attended Homer High School. He served as a member of the Claiborne Parish Police Jury. McCalman had worked as a businessperson. In 1960, he was elected to the Louisiana State Senate, succeeding William M. Rainach. In 1964, he was succeeded by Danny Roy Moore for the office.

McCalman died in June 1977 at the Homer Memorial Hospital, at the age of 63. He was buried in Arlington Cemetery.

References 

1914 births
1977 deaths
People from Claiborne Parish, Louisiana
People from Homer, Louisiana
Democratic Party Louisiana state senators
20th-century American politicians
Burials in Louisiana
American businesspeople
Businesspeople from Louisiana
20th-century American businesspeople